The Romagnola is a breed of cattle from the Emilia-Romagna region of Northern Italy. It belongs to the Podolic group of grey cattle. Romagnola cattle were used principally as draught beasts in the past; since the mechanisation of agriculture in the middle of the twentieth century they have been bred primarily for beef production.

History

As with other European grey cattle, it has been suggested that the Romagnola breed derives from Podolian cattle from the steppes of eastern Europe, possibly brought to Italy by invading Goths in the fourth century AD or by the Lombard king Agilulf. This hypothesis is based on the zoological theories of the nineteenth century, going back to the Bos taurus podolicus of Johann Andreas Wagner. It is not supported by modern genetic, zoological or archaeological research.

There were in the past a number of local sub-types of Romagnola cattle, including the Bolognese in the area of Bologna, the Ferrarese in the area of Ferrara, a mountain type ("di monte") and a lowland type ("gentile di pianura"). Selective breeding towards the modern type began in about 1850, and the resulting stock won prizes both in Italy and abroad. In Paris in 1900 the Romagnola was judged jointly with the Hereford to be the "best beef breed".

The Romagnola was however principally a draught breed, and was bred for that purpose, with massive and powerful foreparts and short strong legs. Following the progressive mechanisation of agriculture in the years after the Second World War the breeding strategy changed completely, and was directed towards beef production. To this end, cross-breeding with Chianina cattle was attempted, but did not give the desired results. A herd book was established in 1963.

More than 80% of the registered Italian population is in Emilia-Romagna; there are small populations in Abruzzo, Basilicata, Campania, Calabria, Lazio, Lombardy, the Marche, Puglia, Tuscany and the Veneto. Some animals were exported to Scotland in the early 1970s and the breed is present in small numbers in Great Britain, Ireland, North and South America, Australia, New Zealand and Africa.

Numbers in Italy have fallen sharply since the Second World War. In 1952 there were 450,000 head; this fell to 250,000 in 1965, to 120,000 in 1977 and to 45,000 in 1980. At the end of 2013 the total number recorded for the breed in Italy was 13,054.

Characteristics

Romagnola cattle are ivory-white, tending to grey on the foreparts, particularly in bulls; the skin and natural openings are black. The colour of the coat varies with the season, and is darker in winter. The horns are light, lyre-shaped in cows, half-moon-shaped in bulls; they are slate-grey in young animals, becoming pale at the base and dark at the tip with maturity. As with all Podolic cattle, the calves are born wheat-coloured but become white at about three months.

Use

The Romagnola was in the past primarily a draught breed, though raised also for meat; limited dairy use is also documented. In the years before and after the Second World War the progressive mechanisation of agriculture meant that demand for draught oxen disappeared. It is now raised only for meat.

The meat is considered to be of high quality and carries a registered mark of quality. With the Chianina and the Marchigiana, the Romagnola is one of three breeds whose meat may, if raised within a specific area of the Apennines of central Italy, have IGP status as Vitellone Bianco dell'Appennino Centrale.

References

Cattle breeds
Cattle breeds originating in Italy
Ark of Taste foods